The Lindsay Pryor National Arboretum is an arboretum on the Yarramundi Reach peninsula in Canberra, the capital of Australia. It is named after Lindsay Pryor, a noted Australian botanist. The site is located at the western end of Lake Burley Griffin and is used for research and recreation.

Trees of the arboretum were mostly planted 1954-1957 by Lindsay Pryor. The arboretum was damaged in the 2003 Canberra bushfires.

Gallery

References

External links
Lindsay Pryor National Arboretum webpage on the National Capital Authority website

Parks in Canberra
Arboreta in Australia